"Sing Our Own Song" is a song and single written and performed by British group UB40.  It featured backing singers Jaki Graham, Mo Birch and Ruby Turner and was the ninth and final track on their album Rat in the Kitchen. Released in 1986 it reached 5, on the UK charts, staying for nine weeks.  It made 1 on the Dutch charts in 1986.

The song was written as an anti-apartheid song and was censored in South Africa. Featuring the ANC rallying cry of "Amandla Awethu", it is considered a protest song of the time.

Charts

Weekly charts

Year-end charts

References 

1986 songs
UB40 songs
Protest songs
1986 singles
Songs against racism and xenophobia